Books of secrets were compilations of technical and medicinal recipes and magic formulae that began to be printed in the sixteenth century and were published continuously down to the eighteenth century.  They constituted one of the most popular genres in early modern scientific publishing.  The books of secrets contained hundreds of medical recipes, household hints, and technical recipes on metallurgy, alchemy, dyeing, making perfume, oil, incense, and cosmetics.  The books of secrets supplied a great deal of practical information to an emerging new, middle-class readership, leading some historians to link them with the emerging secularistic values of the early modern period and to see them as contributing to the making of an ‘age of how-to.’

Some books of secrets, such as Alessio Piemontese's famous Secreti (1555), contained mainly practical and technological information in the form of useful recipes.  Others, such as Giambattista Della Porta's Magia Naturalis (Natural Magic, 1558) deployed practical recipes in an effort to demonstrate the principles of natural magic.  Other books of secrets, such as Isabella Cortese's Secreti (1564), disseminated alchemical information to a wide readership.  Recent research has suggested that the books of secrets may have played an important role in the emergence of experimental science by bringing practical technical information to the attention of experimental scientists.

Publications

William Eamon, Science and the Secrets of Nature: Books of Secrets in Medieval and Early Modern Culture (Princeton: Princeton University Press, 1994).
John K. Ferguson, Bibliographical Notes on Histories of Inventions and Books of Secrets.  2 vols.  London:  Holland Press, 1959.

References

Books by type
Occult books